Three Girls for Schubert is a 1936 German historical romance film directed by E. W. Emo and starring Paul Hörbiger, Gretl Theimer, and Maria Andergast. It was shot at the Johannisthal Studios of Tobis Film in Berlin. The film's sets were designed by the art directors Fritz Maurischat and Karl Weber. Location filming took place in Vienna and the Vienna Woods outside the city.

Cast

See also
 The House of Three Girls (1918)
 Blossom Time (1934)
 The House of Three Girls (1958)

References

Bibliography 
 
 Klaus, Ulrich J. Deutsche Tonfilme: Jahrgang 1936. Klaus-Archiv, 1988.

External links 
 

1936 films
1930s romantic musical films
1930s historical romance films
German historical romance films
German romantic musical films
Films of Nazi Germany
1930s German-language films
Films directed by E. W. Emo
Films set in Vienna
Films shot in Vienna
Films set in the 1820s
Films about composers
Films about classical music and musicians
Films based on Austrian novels
Remakes of German films
Sound film remakes of silent films
Cultural depictions of Franz Schubert
Tobis Film films
German black-and-white films
1930s historical musical films
German historical musical films
Films set in the Austrian Empire
Biographical films about composers
1930s German films
Films shot at Johannisthal Studios